Mongolotettix is a genus of grasshoppers belonging to the family Acrididae.

The species of this genus are found in Eastern Asia.

Species:
 Mongolotettix angustiseptus Wan, Bingzhong Ren & Fengling Zhang, 1998 
 Mongolotettix anomopterus (Caudell, 1921)

References

Acrididae
Acrididae genera